Francis Luiggi (19 January 1932 – 1 August 2019) was a French bobsledder. He competed in the four-man event at the 1968 Winter Olympics.

His death was announced on 6 August 2019.

References

1932 births
2019 deaths
French male bobsledders
Olympic bobsledders of France
Bobsledders at the 1968 Winter Olympics
Sportspeople from Marseille